SSLT may refer to:

Alegrete Airport
Subsurface light transport